USS Dauphin (APA-97) was a Windsor-class attack transport that served with the United States Navy from 1944 to 1946. She was sold into commercial service in 1948 and was scrapped in 1979.

History
Dauphin (APA-97) was named after Dauphin County, Pennsylvania. Dauphin (APA-97) was launched 10 June 1944 by Bethlehem Sparrows Point Shipyard, Sparrows Point, Maryland, under a Maritime Commission contract; transferred to the Navy 23 September 1944; and commissioned the same day.

Pacific War
Dauphin reported to Newport, Rhode Island 29 October 1944 for duty training precommissioning crews of transport and cargo ships, so serving 36 ships. Clearing Newport 20 January 1945 she arrived at Norfolk, Virginia the next day to load cargo, and on 13 February got underway for the Pacific.

She embarked troops and combat cargo at Pearl Harbor between 5 and 29 March, and arrived at Ulithi staging point for the Okinawa operation 15 April. She sailed from Ulithi on the 22d to land reinforcements at Hagushi Beach, Okinawa, from 26 to 30 April. Carrying casualties, she called at Saipan and arrived at San Francisco 22 May.

A week later Dauphin was underway for the Philippines. From 27 June until the end of the war she carried troops from New Guinea to the Philippines.

Operation Magic Carpet
On 26 August, Dauphin sailed from Batangas Bay, Luzon, with occupation troops. She anchored in Tokyo Bay the day of surrender, 2 September, and from 4 September to 27 October made four similar voyages carrying troops from the Philippines to Japan. Assigned to the Operation Magic Carpet fleet she made two voyages carrying home veterans from Sasebo, Japan, and San Pedro Bay, Leyte, between 6 November 1945 and 17 January 1946.

Decommissioning and fate
On the last day of January she put out for the east coast, arriving at Norfolk 17 February. Dauphin was decommissioned there 3 April 1946 and delivered to the War Shipping Administration the next day for disposal. Dauphin was sold for commercial service in 1948, being refurbished as passenger-cargo ship SS Exochorda, and later becoming SS Stevens, a floating dormitory for Stevens Institute of Technology. She was scrapped in 1979.

Awards
Dauphin earned one battle star for World War II service.

References

APA-97 Dauphin, Navsource Online.

 

Windsor-class attack transports
Type C3-S-A3 ships of the United States Navy
Ships built in Sparrows Point, Maryland
1944 ships
World War II amphibious warfare vessels of the United States
USS Dauphin APA-97
Ships of American Export-Isbrandtsen Lines